Badminton at the 2018 Summer Youth Olympics was held from 7 to 12 October. The events took place at the Tecnópolis in Buenos Aires, Argentina.

Qualification
A total of 32 athletes will participate in each gender. Each National Olympic Committee (NOC) can enter a maximum of 2 competitors per gender should they both rank in the top 4 in the BWF Junior World Rankings. Otherwise each NOC will only be allowed a maximum of 1 competitor per gender.

Each of the five continents must be represented in each gender. 27 quotas per gender will be decided based on BWF World Junior Ranking List on 3 May 2018. Host nation Argentina was ensured one quota place each gender. The remaining 4 quotas were made eligible for Universality Places. To be eligible to participate, athletes must be on BWF World Junior Ranking List on 3 May 2018 and have been born between 1 January 2000 and 31 December 2003.

Qualification summary

Boys

Quota spots earned by Russia was returned, and were subsequently reallocated to Spain.

Girls

Quota spots earned by Denmark, South Korea and Indonesia were returned, and were subsequently reallocated to Dominican Republic, Brazil and Sweden. One universality spot was also not used and this was reallocated to the next eligible nation in the world rankings: Sri Lanka. Later the quota place for Russia, the host spot, and another universality spot were returned and reallocated to Indonesia, Ukraine, and the Netherlands respectively. Eventually there were 31 participants, Wei Yaxin from China did not compete.

Medal summary

Medal table

Events

References

External links
Official Results Book – Badminton

 
2018 Summer Youth Olympics events
Youth Summer Olympics
Badminton at the Youth Olympics
Badminton in Argentina